Metarhizium flavoviride is the name given to a group of fungal isolates that are known to be virulent against Hemiptera and some Coleoptera.  Spores (conidia) are light grey-green and oval-shaped (approximately 7-11 µm long).

As with other Metarhizium species, there has been interest in developing isolates into mycoinsecticides: with work carried out on rice insect pests during the 1970-80s. However, such isolates appear to be more difficult to mass-produce, so there has been less commercial activity than with other Metarhizium species.  In light of new molecular techniques, we now know that references to this species for control of locusts (e.g. in early LUBILOSA Programme literature) should apply to Metarhizium acridum.

References

Clavicipitaceae
Parasitic fungi
Fungi described in 1973